Poetic realism was a film movement in France of the 1930s. More a tendency than a movement, poetic realism is not strongly unified like Soviet montage or French Impressionism but were individuals who created this lyrical style. Its leading filmmakers were Pierre Chenal, Jean Vigo, Julien Duvivier, Marcel Carné, and, perhaps the movement's most significant director, Jean Renoir. Renoir made a wide variety of films some influenced by the leftist Popular Front group and even a lyrical short feature film. Frequent stars of these films were Jean Gabin, Michel Simon, Simone Signoret, and Michèle Morgan.

Characteristics
Poetic realism films are "recreated realism", stylised and studio-bound, rather than approaching the "socio-realism of the documentary". They usually have a fatalistic view of life with their characters living on the margins of society, either as unemployed members of the working class or as criminals. After a life of disappointment, the characters get a last chance at love but are ultimately disappointed again and the films frequently end with disillusionment or death. The overall tone often resembles nostalgia and bitterness. They are "poetic" because of a heightened aestheticism that sometimes draws attention to the representational aspects of the films.  Though these films were weak in the production sector, French cinema did create a high proportion of such influential films largely due to the talented people in the industry in the 1930s who were working on them. The most popular set designer was Lazare Meerson. Composers who worked on these films included Georges Auric, Arthur Honegger, Joseph Kosma, and Maurice Jaubert. Screenwriters who contributed to many of the films included Charles Spaak and Jacques Prévert. The movement had a significant impact on later film movements, in particular Italian neorealism (many of the neorealists, most notably Luchino Visconti, worked with poetic realist directors before starting their own careers as film critics and directors) and the French New Wave.

Notable examples
Forerunners of the poetic realist movement include:
 La Petite Lise (1930) by Jean Grémillon
 Zéro de conduite (1933) by Jean Vigo
 Pension Mimosas (1934) by Jacques Feyder
 Le Grand Jeu (1934) by Jacques Feyder

Poetic realist works from leading filmmakers of the mid-to-late 1930s/mid-to-late 1940s include:
 L'Atalante (1934) by Jean Vigo
 La Bandera (1935) by Julien Duvivier
 La Belle Équipe (1936) by Julien Duvivier
 Les Bas-fonds (The Lower Depths) (1936) by Jean Renoir
 Pépé le Moko (1937) by Julien Duvivier 
 La Grande Illusion (1937) by Jean Renoir
 La Bête humaine (1938) by Jean Renoir
 Le Quai des brumes (1938) by Marcel Carné
 Hôtel du Nord (1938) by Marcel Carné
 La Règle du jeu (1939) by Jean Renoir
 Le Jour se lève (1939) by Marcel Carné
 Remorques (1941) by Jean Grémillon
 Lumière d’été (Summer Light) (1943) by Jean Grémillon
 Children of Paradise (1945) by Marcel Carné

Further reading 
 COMOLLI Jean-Louis, « RÉALISME POÉTIQUE, cinéma français », dans Encyclopædia Universalis , consulté le 28 juillet 2019.
 PINEL Vincent, "Réalisme poétique" dans PINEL Vincent,  Ecoles, genres et mouvements au cinéma, Larousse, Comprendre et reconnaître, Paris,  2000. p. 184-185

References

External links
Feyder's "Le Grand Jeu" and the Idea of Poetic Realism on JSTOR

Movements in cinema
Realism (art movement)
1930s in film
1940s in film
Modern art